HMS Blandford was a member of the Gibraltar Group of 24-gun sixth rates. After commissioning she spent her career in Home Waters and the Baltic on trade protection duties. She was lost with all hands in a storm in the Bay of Biscay in March 1719.

Blandford was the first named vessel in the Royal Navy.

Construction
She was ordered on 24 January 1711 from Woolwich Dockyard to be built under the guidance of Jacob Acworth, Master Shipwright of Woolwich. She was launched on 29 October 1711.

Commissioned Service
She was commissioned in 1712 under the command of Commander Mungo Herdman, RN (promoted to captain in January 1713) for service in the English Channel then on to the Baltic in 1713 with a deployment to the Mediterranean in 1714. She under the command of Captain Alesander Geddes, RN in 1715 then Captain Charles Boyle, RN in 1716 in the Baltic. She was underwent a small repair at Deptford from March to May 1716 at a cost of £1,173.19.11d. She was under the command of Captain Erasmus Phillips, RN for service in the English Channel and the North Sea in 1717.

Disposition
HMS Blandford was lost with all hands during a storm in the Bay of Biscay on 23 March 1719.

Notes

Citations

References
 Winfield 2009, British Warships in the Age of Sail (1603 – 1714), by Rif Winfield, published by Seaforth Publishing, England © 2009, EPUB , Chapter 6, The Sixth Rates, Vessels acquired from 2 May 1660, Gibraltar Group, Blandford
 Winfield 2007, British Warships in the Age of Sail (1714 – 1792), by Rif Winfield, published by Seaforth Publishing, England © 2007, EPUB , Chapter 6, Sixth Rates, Sixth Rates of 20 or 24 guns, Vessels in Service at 1 August 1714, Gibraltar Group, Blandford
 Colledge, Ships of the Royal Navy, by J.J. Colledge, revised and updated by Lt Cdr Ben Warlow and Steve Bush, published by Seaforth Publishing, Barnsley, Great Britain, © 2020, EPUB , (EPUB), Section B (Blandford)

 

1710s ships
Corvettes of the Royal Navy
Ships built in Portsmouth
Naval ships of the United Kingdom